Lan or LAN may also refer to:

Science and technology
 Local asymptotic normality, a fundamental property of regular models in statistics
 Longitude of the ascending node, one of the orbital elements used to specify the orbit of an object in space
 Łan, unit of measurement in Poland
 Local area network, a computer network that interconnects within a limited area such as one or more buildings
 Lan blood group system, a human blood group

Places
 Lancashire (Chapman code), England 
 Lancaster railway station (National Rail station code), England 
 Capital Region International Airport (IATA airport code), Lansing, Michigan, US
 Lan County, Shanxi, China
 Łan, Lublin Voivodeship, Poland
 Lan (river), Belarus
 Llan (placename), a placename element known in Breton as lan

Airlines
 LAN Airlines, former name of LATAM Chile, an airline in Chile, with a stake in other airlines:
 LAN Peru, an airline based in Peru
 LAN Ecuador, an airline based in Quito, Ecuador
 LAN Argentina, a defunct Argentinian airline
 LAN Dominicana, a defunct Dominican airline
 LAN Colombia, an airline based in Bogotá, Colombia

Arts
 Lan (film), a 2009 Chinese film
 Lan Mandragoran, a fictional character from Robert Jordan's The Wheel of Time series
 Lan Hikari, protagonist of the Mega Man: Battle Network series of video games and animated television shows

People
 Lan (surname 蓝), a Chinese surname
 Lan (surname 兰), a Chinese surname
 Lan (given name), a given name (including a list of people with the name)
 Lan (tribe), ethnic group in Han dynasty China
 David Lan (born 1952), South African-born British playwright
 Donald Lan (1930–2019), American politician
Phạm Chi Lan, Vietnamese economist

Other uses
 Län, administrative division used in Sweden and until 2009 in Finland
 Lan (tribe), a tribe of Eastern Huns
 Lan, a Cantonese profanity
 Lockwood, Andrews & Newnam, an American civil engineering company
 Typhoon Lan, a tropical cyclone of the 2017 Pacific typhoon season

See also
 Lymphadenopathy
 LAN party, a social happening on a local area network e.g multiplayer games.
 Lans (disambiguation)
 Ian
 Llan (disambiguation)